Cryptolechia paranthaedeaga is a moth in the family Depressariidae. It was described by Wang in 2003. It is found in the Chinese provinces of Gansu, Jiangxi and Zhejiang.

References

Moths described in 2003
Cryptolechia (moth)